Aphaenops crypticola is a species of beetle in the subfamily Trechinae. It was described by Linder in 1859.

References

crypticola
Beetles described in 1859